Jhaustin Thomas (born April 13, 1993) is a professional Canadian football defensive lineman who is currently a free agent. He was most recently a member of the Hamilton Tiger-Cats of the Canadian Football League (CFL). He played college football for the Trinity Valley Cardinals from 2013 to 2014 and the Iowa State Cyclones from 2015 to 2016.

Professional career

Indianapolis Colts
After going undrafted in the 2017 NFL Draft, Thomas signed as an undrafted free agent with the Indianapolis Colts on May 4, 2017. He played in all four pre-season games in 2017, but was part of final roster cuts on September 2, 2017.

Cleveland Browns
Thomas signed a practice squad agreement with the Cleveland Browns on September 19, 2017, but was released shortly after on September 22, 2017.

Oakland Raiders
On October 25, 2017, Thomas signed with the Oakland Raiders, but he was released on October 28, 2017.

Denver Broncos
Thomas signed with the Denver Broncos on December 7, 2017 to their practice squad where he remained for the rest of the 2017 NFL season. He signed a futures contract after the season ended, but was released on April 30, 2018.

Toronto Argonauts
Thomas signed with the Toronto Argonauts during the team's training camp on May 25, 2019. He played in the team's first preseason game on May 30, 2019 where he was injured and subsequently released on June 1, 2019. He was re-signed to a practice roster agreement on July 17, 2019 where he remained until making his professional regular season debut on August 16, 2019 in a start against the Edmonton Eskimos where he had one defensive tackle. He recorded his first sack on September 2, 2019 in the Labour Day Classic against the Hamilton Tiger-Cats. In total, he played in 11 regular season games, making five starts at tackle, while recording 14 defensive tackles and one sack.

In the following off-season, Thomas signed a contract extension with the Argonauts on December 9, 2019. However, the 2020 CFL season was cancelled and Thomas did not play in 2020. He then signed another extension on December 18, 2020. However, he was released following the end of the team's training camp on July 29, 2021.

Hamilton Tiger-Cats
On August 13, 2021, it was announced that Thomas had signed with the Hamilton Tiger-Cats. He spent time on the team's practice roster and was eventually released on September 27, 2021.

References

External links
Hamilton Tiger-Cats bio

1993 births
Living people
American football defensive linemen
Canadian football defensive linemen
Cleveland Browns players
Denver Broncos players
Hamilton Tiger-Cats players
Indianapolis Colts players
Iowa State Cyclones football players
Oakland Raiders players
Players of American football from Atlanta
Players of Canadian football from Atlanta
Toronto Argonauts players
Trinity Valley Cardinals football players